Brain Candy was a standup comedy variety program broadcast on BBC Three in 2003. A total of 14 episodes, filmed on location around London, were broadcast, featuring then up-and-coming comedians, including Paul Foot, Alan Carr, Jimmy Carr, Gina Yashere, Noel Fielding, Alex Horne, and others. The soundtrack was produced by Fatboy Slim.

References 

British comedy television shows
2003 British television series debuts
2003 British television series endings